Marjorie Hall Harrison (September 14, 1918 – August 6, 1986) was an English-born American astronomer.

Hall was born in Nottingham, England in September 1918. In 1947, she authored one of the first scientific books, a dissertation while at the Yerkes Observatory of the University of Chicago, with the word "model" in the title. This work describes the processes that fuel stars and is among the first works that endeavored to create detailed mathematical models for complex physical systems. Along with Subrahmanyan Chandrasekhar, George Gamow and G. Keller, Harrison published models in 1944, 1946 and 1947 discussing stars modeled with hydrogen-depleted and isothermal cores. As a doctoral student of S. Chandrasekhar at the University of Chicago, she received a degree in astronomy in 1947.

A brother, Cecil Hall, was one of Eli Franklin Burton's graduate students who build the first practical electron microscope at the University of Toronto in 1938. Hall Harrison died in Huntsville, Texas in August 1986 at the age of 67.

References
Harrison, Marjorie Hall. "Stellar models."  Thesis, University of Chicago (1947).
"The Generalized Cowling Model."  The Astrophysical Journal, vol. 100, p. 343 (1944).
"A Stellar Model with a Gravitational Source of Energy." The Astrophysical Journal, vol. 102, p. 216 (1945).
"Stellar Models with Partially Degenerate Isothermal Cores and Point-Source Envelopes." The Astrophysical Journal, vol. 103, p. 193 (1946).
"Stellar Models with Isothermal Cores and Point-Source Envelopes."  The Astrophysical Journal, vol. 105, p. 322 (March, 1947).
"On the Chemical Composition of the sun from its Internal Constitution." The Astrophysical Journal, vol. 1098, p. 310 (1948).
"Note on the Chemical Composition of the Sun." The Astrophysical Journal, vol. 111, p. 446 (1950).
Donald E. Osterbrock.  "Chandra and his students at Yerkes Observatory"  J. Astrophys. Astr.(1996) 17, 233–268.

References

1918 births
1986 deaths
20th-century British astronomers
People from Nottingham
University of Chicago alumni
Women astronomers
20th-century British women scientists
British emigrants to the United States